Martin Eriksson (born ) is a Swedish male  cyclo-cross cyclist. He represented his nation in the men's elite event at the 2016 UCI Cyclo-cross World Championships  in Heusden-Zolder.

References

External links
 Profile at cyclingarchives.com

1992 births
Living people
Cyclo-cross cyclists
Swedish male cyclists
Place of birth missing (living people)
Sportspeople from Gothenburg
21st-century Swedish people